Swanwhite may refer to:

, a play by August Strindberg (1901)
Swanwhite (Sibelius), incidental music written by Jean Sibelius for Strindberg's play (1908)
a character in The Chronicles of Narnia by C. S. Lewis (1950–56)